Kanekotrochus is a genus of sea snails, marine gastropod mollusks in the family Trochidae, the top snails.

Species
Species within the genus Kanekotrochus include:
 Kanekotrochus boninensis (Okutani, 2001)
 Kanekotrochus infuscatus Gould, A.A., 1861 
 Kanekotrochus vietnamensis Dekker, 2006
Species brought into synonymy
 Kanekotrochus yokohamensis (Bock, 1878): synonym of Kanekotrochus infuscatus (Gould, 1861)

References

 Dekker H. (2006). Description of a new species of Kanekotrochus (Gastropoda: Trochidae) from Vietnam. Miscellanea Malacologia, 2(1): 1-4

 
Trochidae
Gastropod genera